Jolovan Wham is a Singaporean activist. He has previously served as executive director of the Humanitarian Organization for Migration Economics. The International Federation for Human Rights has stated that he has been the target of judicial harassment, while Amnesty International have stated that "Singapore authorities have repeatedly sought to make an example of his activism to deter Singaporeans who might dare criticize the government."

Biography 
In March 2019, Singaporean authorities launched an investigation for illegal public assembly after Wham had posted a photo on social media of himself holding a sign calling for charges against the editors of The Online Citizen to be dropped.

In March 2020, Wham was fined for contempt of court after having made a Facebook post the previous year criticising the lack of independence of Singapore's courts. After refusing to pay the fine, he was sentenced to a one-week jail term.

In May 2020, Wham posted a letter of apology to Minister of Manpower Josephine Teo after she threatened to sue him over accusations of corruption.

In November 2020, Wham was charged with illegal public assembly by Singaporean authorities after having held up a cardboard poster of a smiley-face outside of a police station in support of two climate activists who had been issued with summons for interrogation by police.

When a 68-year-old Singaporean named Abdul Kahar Othman was sentenced to death and hanged at Changi Prison on 30 March 2022 for drug trafficking, Jolovan Wham organised and spoke at a 400-men protest at Hong Lim Park to show opposition to the Singapore government's use of the death penalty on 3 April 2022, and urged the government to abolish capital punishment, especially when another drug trafficker and Malaysian Nagaenthran K. Dharmalingam was at risk of imminent execution due to him losing his final appeal five days before. Nagaenthran was hanged on 27 April 2022 at age 34.

See also 
 List of Singaporean dissidents

References 

Singaporean activists

Year of birth missing (living people)
Living people